Adaikalam is a 2006 Indian Tamil-language drama film directed by Bhuvanaraja and produced by N. Sri Narayanathas for Kaladas Creations. The film stars Prashanth, Uma, Thiagarajan, and Saranya with a score composed by Sabesh–Murali. The film was released on 29 December 2006.

Plot
Anbu is a doctor and also a lovable brother of Thamizh, who are the son and daughter of Kasthuri. Somasundaram, is Anbu's uncle who takes care of Thamizh and her family. One day Anbu learns about Thamizh's love and arranges for the marriage. During wedding preparations unexpectedly, Kasthuri dies out of shock. Hence Somasundaram calls Anbu's father Sathyamurthy, who was separated from Kasthuri long ago. Anbu is infuriated and argues with Somasundaram not to allow Sathyamurthy to conduct the funeral and rituals. Sathyamurthy is repeatedly snubbed by his children; unperturbed by their mistreatment, he stays quietly with his family, bearing this agony. As story moves on, Sathyamurthy feels sad and shares his story to Somasundaram. Somasundaram narrates the flashback to Anbu and Thamizh and reveals their father's real story.

Sixteen years back, Sathyamurthy and Kasthuri, with their two children, were living happily. When Kasthuri gets pregnant for the third time, Sathyamurthy requests her to abort the baby on doctors' advice. But Kasthuri was adamant to continue bearing the child, so she quarrels with her husband, leaves him abruptly, walks away with her children, and spends the rest of her life with her brother. When she is unconscious, the doctor had aborted the child. After finishing the flashback, Somasundaram says that all their financial needs and wants were fulfilled indirectly by Sathyamurthy from their childhood and for their education also. At last Anbu and Thamizh realize the truth and they accept and reunite with his children.

Cast
 Prashanth as Anbu
 Uma as Thamizh
 Thiagarajan as Sathyamurthy
 Saranya Ponvannan as Kasthuri
 Radharavi as Somasundaram
 Ravichandran as Thamizh's father-in-law
 Nalini as Doctor
 Hemalatha as Amudha

Production
Production for the film began in August 2004 with Prashanth and Uma signed on to play a brother and sister in the film. The film was revealed to be produced by Kaladass Creations, who had earlier produced Balu Mahendra's off-beat film Veedu (1988), while it would be directed by debutant Bhuvanaraja. Bhuvanaraja had earlier narrated two different scripts to Prashanth and by chance mentioned a partial storyline for a third, with the actor impressed with the final one. Unlike most other Tamil-language films, Adaikalam did not feature a romantic sub-plot for the lead character and Prashanth appreciated that he had accepted to work on the film purely for its strong script and screenplay. He cast Prashanth's real life father, Thiagarajan, in a pivotal role while actress Nalini worked on the film free of charge after being impressed with the film's story. The shoot for the film continued throughout regions in Kanyakumari in October 2004.

The film was reported to be ready for release in April 2005. Once the film was completed, the release was delayed after the producer became caught up with business commitments abroad. The film was further delayed as they did not want to clash with other films with similar themes such as Cheran's Thavamai Thavamirundhu (2005) and Thirumurugan's Emmtan-Magan (2006). Subsequently, the director went on to start and work on another film titled Brindavanathil Nandakumaran, though it later did not release. A press-meet was held in November 2006, where the makers revealed that all production hurdles had been passed and subsequently released a trailer for the film.

Release
The film opened on 29 December 2006 to positive reviews from critics, with Malathi Rangarajan of The Hindu writing "'Adaikkalam' is for those who look for a reasonable amount of reality in cinema. Bhuvanaraja has waited long enough for the film to see the light of day. Now that it has, more such breaks ought to follow. The maker deserves it." Indiaglitz.com gave the film a positive review mentioning "director Bhuvanaraja can be appreciated for the fact that he has not taken recourse to the many short ways. He has stuck to the simple path and delivered a good cinema. It maybe slow in places, but it doesn't pull a fast one on you. That's where Adaikalam is different." Another reviewer also praised the film adding "the movie also has a glacial pace, especially in the first half, that threatens to — but fortunately doesn't — overcome all its good points."

Soundtrack

The soundtrack was composed by the duo Sabesh–Murali.

References

External links
 

2006 films
2006 drama films
2000s Tamil-language films
Indian drama films
Indian family films
2006 directorial debut films